The South Korea national rugby union team, (Korean:) recognized as Korea by World Rugby, has yet to make their debut at the Rugby World Cup.

Korea were at their peak in the 1980s, where they won 3 consecutive Asian championships (defeating full-strength Japan squads), and even managed to play a test against the Wallabies. Korea reached the repechage round of qualification for the 1999, 2003, and  2007 Rugby World Cups, being eliminated by Tonga each time.  They also failed to qualify for the 2011 Rugby World Cup. They did not qualify for the 2019 Rugby World Cup

Korea participated in the 2008 Asian Five Nations, the inaugural Asian Five Nations.

History
It is unknown when rugby was first played in Korea. During the mid-19th century, European sailors are recorded as playing some of the earliest games in north east Asia, in ports such as Shanghai and Yokohama in neighbouring China and Japan, but it is unclear whether this occurred in Korea itself.	
However, it seems certain it had some presence by the mid-20th century. Korea was to become occupied by Japan, the main rugby playing nation of Asia, and it could well have been introduced then. In the amateur days, South Korea maintained a fierce rivalry with Japan.	

After World War II, and later, during the period of the Korean War, the large influx of troops from Commonwealth countries cemented its presence. One legacy of this is that South Korean rugby  has traditionally been strongest in the army.
	
However, South Korean rugby has a second string to its bow. The massive growth of the economy since the 1960s, meant that a number of Korean corporations were to set up company teams along the lines of those in Japan, and this has broken up the former dominance of the military.	

South Korea made a failed attempt to have rugby union at the Olympic Games readmitted, when they hosted the games in Seoul. Roh Tae-woo, who was South Korean president at the time, had been a player.
South Korea have emerged as an important rugby nation in Asia, since they won the Asian Championship in 1990.

Overall

Notable players include  
 Lee Ken-yok
 Kim Yeon-ki
 Sung Hae-kyoung
 Roh Tae-woo, 13th president of South Korea (1988–1993)
 Kim Keon-young

Expatriate rugby 
Expatriate rugby was first played in Korea in 1972. An expat team called the Seoul Wanderers were formed to give opposition to both the local university teams and stationed army teams. This team was made up of players from the UK, New Zealand, and Australia. The team was disbanded in 1976.	
However, the void caused by a lack of rugby was soon to be filled. In late 1977 Billy Cornett and Brad Handley  got together and decided to form a new expat club - the Seoul Survivors. The club is still around today.

Other Expatriate clubs include the Busan Bandits Rugby Football Club (based in Busan), the Ulsan Goblins Rugby Club (based in Ulsan) and the Stars & Stripes Korea Rugby Club (based in Pyeongtaek).

Current squad
South Korea 31-man squad for the 2015 Asian Rugby Championship.

Head coach:  Chung Hyung-seok

References

External links
Korea at rugbydata.com
Current Squad

 
Rugby union in South Korea